The 2008 Metro Atlantic Athletic Conference baseball tournament took place from May 22 through 24, 2008. The top four regular season finishers of the league's teams met in the double-elimination tournament held at Mercer County Waterfront Park in Trenton, New Jersey.  won their first tournament championship and earned the conference's automatic bid to the 2008 NCAA Division I baseball tournament.

Seeding 
The top four teams were seeded one through four based on their conference winning percentage. They then played a double-elimination tournament.

Results

All-Tournament Team 
The following players were named to the All-Tournament Team.

Most Valuable Player 
James Hayes was named Tournament Most Outstanding Player. Hayes was a designated hitter for Rider.

References 

Tournament
Metro Atlantic Athletic Conference Baseball Tournament
Metro Atlantic Athletic Conference baseball tournament